Club Choré Central, is a Paraguayan football club based in the city of Choré. The club was founded on 19 January 1965 and plays in the Primera B Nacional. The club achieved two participations in the División Intermedia, Paraguay's second-tier league. Their home games are played at the Estadio Asteria Mendoza which has a capacity of approximately 3, 500 seats.

History

2004
The club were champions of the Liga Deportiva de Choré in 2004.

2005
In the 2005 third-tier season, Choré Central were crowned champions and promoted to the División Intermedia for 2006.

2006
The club held it's 2006 pre-season preparation in the city of Itá. On 28 May, Choré defeated Rubio Ñu 2–1 after losing 1–0 in a Round 6 fixture of the season. On 25 June, the club drew 2–2 away against Encarnación team Universal after losing 2–0 in the first half. On 6 August, Choré scored two goals in the last five minutes of the game to defeat Cerro Porteño PF 2–1 to avoid relegation from the second-tier. In the following game, they lost 3–1 against Sol de América after a double from Pablo Zeballos, who ended the season as the league's leading goal scorer. They finished the season in 6th place with 22 points, four points clear of relegation.

2007
During the 2007 División Intermedia season, the club finished in bottom position of the league table with 17 points and were relegated.

Notable players
To appear in this section a player must have either:
 Played at least 125 games for the club.
 Set a club record or won an individual award while at the club.
 Been part of a national team at any time.
 Played in the first division of any other football association (outside of Paraguay).
 Played in a continental and/or intercontinental competition.

2010's
 Josías Paulo Cardoso Júnior (2007–2008)
Non-CONMEBOL players
Ninguno

Honors
 Third Division Titles: 2005

References

External links
PlayMaker Stats Profile
Albigol Profile
 Soccerway Profile

Chore Central
Association football clubs established in 1965
1965 establishments in Paraguay